Wilfred Byford Jones (1905 – 1977) was an English writer and English military officer (Lieutenant Colonel). He wrote extensively about the Middle East, as well as the history of oil production.

Married Cynthia Louise Johnson (1924-2006), Westminster, March-qtr 1947.

Selected publications
Uncensored Eyewitness, 1961
Oil On Troubled Waters, 1958
Adventures With Two Passports
The Greek Trilogy. Resistance-liberation-revolution, 1945
Four Faces of Peru, 1967

References

1905 births
1977 deaths
British Army officers
20th-century English male writers